Lamprima aenea is a species of beetle in the family Lucanidae that is found on Norfolk Island.

References

External links
 Photos and information on L. aenea

Beetles described in 1792
Lampriminae
Beetles of Oceania